The Lion of Thebes is a peplum film written and directed by Giorgio Ferroni.

Plot 
When the Greek army conquers Troy, Helen is exiled from her city. Her loyal guard Arion and Helene ends up shipwrecked on the shores of Egypt, they meet a caravan in the desert and escape from them to Thebes. In the Egyptian city, the Pharaoh Ramses falls in love with Helen, and this ends up making her numerous enemies during her stay in Egypt. She ends up being blamed for the assassination of Ramses, and its up to Arion to save her from those who wish to harm her.

Cast 
 Mark Forest as Arion
 Yvonne Furneaux as Helen of Troy
 Massimo Serato as Tutmes
 Pierre Cressoy as Ramses
 Alberto Lupo as Menelao
 Nerio Bernardi as Xesostus
 Rosalba Neri as Nais
 Carlo Tamberlani as Amenofis
 Nello Pazzafini as Gaor
 Tullio Altamura as Elnà 
 Enzo Fiermonte as Tutmès' henchman

Production 
The film was shot at the De Paolis studios in Rome.

Release
The Lion of Thebes was released in Italy with an 88 minute running time on June 28, 1964. It was released in 1965 in the United States.

References

Sources

External links

The Lion of Thebes at Variety Distribution

1964 films
1960s adventure films
Peplum films
French historical adventure films
Films directed by Giorgio Ferroni
Films based on the Odyssey
Films set in ancient Egypt
Films set in the Mediterranean Sea
Films about survivors of seafaring accidents or incidents
Films scored by Francesco De Masi
Sword and sandal films
Cultural depictions of Helen of Troy
1960s French films
1960s Italian films